The Battle of Kratzau occurred on 11 November 1428 between an Imperial Silesian army and the Sirotci Hussites in Kratzau, Bohemia. During the battle, the Imperial Silesian army under Hans von Polenz overpowered the Hussite troops. In November 1428, the Hussites under the leadership of Jan Královec launched a campaign from the occupied Kratzau of Friedland and Ostritz to Löbau. The city was not taken by the Hussites, and so they retreated back to Kratzau. Silesian and Lusatia troops pursued the Hussites, defeating them near Kratzau. The loss of vehicles with rations was essential for the Hussites, since supplies were intended for units besieging the Lichnice Castle.

References

1428 in Europe
Kratzau 1428
Kratzau 1428
Kratzau
Conflicts in 1428
History of the Liberec Region